There is substantive false reaction of A30 with A*3101, otherwise serological identification is good.

Distribution

Haplotypes

Examination of A31 haplotypes reveals a probable connection across northern Eurasia during the prehistoric period.  Frequencies of the more 'tale-tell' haplotypes (A31-B60, B61, and B62) fall from NE to SW Europe.  Other haplotypes appears to have spread from the Middle East (A31-B51 and A31-B35).

References 

3